Gowdanapalya is one of the residential localities in Bangalore, India. It is situated in the south of the city, very close to the highway leading to Kanakapura. It is surrounded by Kumaraswamy Layout, Padmanabhanagar, Kadirenahalli, Uttarahalli, and Chikkakalasandra.

This is one of the rapidly growing areas in Bangalore. This makes it one of the most conservative places to live in Bangalore. It has a substantial population of long-term, mostly Kannada-speaking residents. The area acts as a connecting link between ISRO Layout/Kumaraswamy Layout and Padmanabhanagar.

Gowdanapalya is known for being the locality where "Rapsri engineering industries ltd" is located. It is also known for its educational institutions viz. Bangalore International School, Prarthana School and Bright Way School to name a few. The popular cinema theatre 'Srinivasa Theatre' is a part of this area.

The one of the facts is about this place is, It once had two big Lakes, namely, "Dore Kere" and "Gowdana-Kere". Now it has reduced to just one ("Dore Kere"), due to lack of care. Dore kere is popular among joggers. It also has a park with gym equipments and next to Dore kere is a place to play badminton called usa. People also play cricket, football, throwball and many other games in usa. 
This place is a religious and has a vast history this village was just holding 18houses in 1965 where people use to grow ragi and the oldest family who lived in this town are chikkana and sons even today his grandsons stay here there is a street named after him.
Town is also place for the power full god durga every Tuesday and Friday 100to 200 people gather here it's a belief that ma durga stays here and bless every one

Transport

The area is well connected through the BMTC buses. Most of the buses to Uttarahalli pass through the Gowdanapalya junction.

Towards Kempegowda Bus Terminus : 210N, 210NA, 210P, 210Z, 210NB, 210ND
Towards K R Market : 210N, 210NA, 210P, 210Z, 210NB, 210ND
Towards Shivajinagara : 210Q, 210H
Towards Kengeri: 375 series

The nearest Namma_Metro station is Banashankari on the Green_Line_(Namma_Metro).

Neighbourhoods in Bangalore